Holovetsko is a village (selo) in Stryi Raion, Lviv Oblast, of Western Ukraine. It belongs to Slavske settlement hromada, one of the hromadas of Ukraine. Local government is administered by Holovetska village council.

Geography 
The village is situated in the Ukrainian Carpathians along the river Holovchanka (Khitarka, Vandrivka ). The village is located at the foot of the legendary Makivka mountain.

History and Attractions 
The first record of the village dates back to 1574.

Until 18 July 2020, Holovetsko belonged to Skole Raion. The raion was abolished in July 2020 as part of the administrative reform of Ukraine, which reduced the number of raions of Lviv Oblast to seven. The area of Skole Raion was merged into Stryi Raion.

In the village was an architectural monument of local importance of Stryi Raion  — Church of the Epiphany (wooden) 1873, (1494-М). The church burned down January 28, 2007.

References

External links 
 village Holovetsko
 weather.in.ua

Literature 
 

Villages in Stryi Raion